Samantha Glenn (born 11 August 1983) is an English actress.

Biography
Glenn trained at the Sylvia Young Theatre School in London.

Glenn began her career as a child actress in Summer's Lease playing the granddaughter to John Gielgud. In The Glass Virgin (filmed 1994), she was Young Annabella. Since then, she has had several leading roles and guest starred in the pilot for The Jim Jeffries Show and did all her own singing for her part as Dana Bigglesworth in Rock Rivals.

Glenn's sister, Wendy Glenn, is also an actress.

External links
Sammy Glenn's official website
Sammy Glenn's MySpace page

1983 births
Living people
English film actresses
English television actresses